Ching Chung Koon is a Taoist Temple and active Taoist organisation located in Tuen Mun, Hong Kong.

History
Ching Chung Koon is a Taoist temple first established in Kowloon during 1950. A permanent temple was eventually built in Tuen Mun during 1960 and a branch temple at Kowloon was established in 1974.

Features
This peaceful temple also contains many treasures, such as lanterns from Beijing's Imperial Palace. The temple is divided into several houses where many dead peoples' bone ashes are permanently stored in special apartments with their picture, name, date of birth, date of death and place of origin. During the Ching Ming and Chung Yeung Festivals, many people come here to remember their relatives or friends who have died.

Besides the temple, there are also Chinese-style gardens, a small man-made "hill" and fishponds. Ching Chung Koon also features bonsai exhibitions which are held periodically.

Welfare services and education
The temple had been offering free TCM medical services since it was first established in 1950s. The first western medical clinic in Ching Chung Koon was established in 1975 offers economical medical services to nearby residents, the second clinic was set up in 1977. Two TCM based free clinics were established in 2003 and 2005.

Since 1980s, the temple had established and managed two secondary schools (Hong Kong Taoist Association Ching Chung Secondary School and Ching Chung Hau Po Woon Secondary School), three primary schools (Taoist Ching Chung Primary School, Taoist Ching Chung Primary School (Wu King Estate) and Ching Chung Hau Po Woon Primary School) and two kindergartens (Ching Chung Wu King Kindergarten and Ching Chung Hing Tung Kindergarten) in Hong Kong. The temple has also established the "Hong Kong Taoist College" in 1991 to promote Taoist education, printing Taoist publications and organising global Taoist conferences.

The temple had also set up an old folk home in 1960, an elderly care home in 1986 and a neighbourhood elderly centre in 1997.

Oversea Branch Temples
In November 1981, Ching Chung Koon set up their first oversea branch temple in San Francisco, United States. At present, Ching Chung Koon has established several oversea branch temples which mainly located in United States, Canada and Australia.

References

External links

 Webpage about Ching Chung Koon
 Ching Chung Koon
 Ching Chung Koon, Hulu Culture

Taoist temples in Hong Kong
Tuen Mun District
Grade II historic buildings in Hong Kong
Religious buildings and structures completed in 1960